The 2023 UTSA Roadrunners football team will represent the University of Texas at San Antonio as a member of American Athletic Conference (The American or AAC) during the 2023 NCAA Division I FBS football season. They will be led by fourth-year head coach Jeff Traylor. The Roadrunners will play their home games at the Alamodome in San Antonio. This will be their inaugural season as a member of the American Athletic Conference.

Previous season

In the 2022 season, the Roadrunners played their final season with Conference USA. During the season, they won all but 2 games in the regular season, won in the 2022 Conference USA Football Championship Game against North Texas, but lost to Troy in the 2022 Cure Bowl.

Transfers

Outgoing
Over the off-season, UTSA has lost seven players trough the transfer portal. Four are currently committed while the remainder are still actively pursuing new schools.

Incoming
Over the off-season, UTSA added four players trough the transfer portal.

Schedule
UTSA and the (AAC) announced the 2023 football schedule on February 21, 2023.  On March 13th the game between UTSA and Army was moved from Saturday September 16th to Friday September 15th.

Coaching staff

References

UTSA
UTSA Roadrunners football seasons
UTSA Roadrunners football